Hungry Days (often stylized as HUNGRY DAYS)(ハングリー・デイズ) is a rockband from Japan, consisting of 4 members. Their records are produced by the Toshiba-EMI label.

Summary
In 2003, Hungry Days participated in a Teen's Music Festival and were also awarded the Teen's Grand Prix. They made their debut with the single "Ashita ni Mukatte". All members were still at high school.

Furthermore, they received an audition for the movie "Beat Kids".

Members

All members were born in Osaka Prefecture.

Discography

Single
 Ashita (明日) - July 2003
 Ashita2 (明日2) - November 2003

Major Hits

Singles
1. Ashita ni Mukatte (明日に向かって) - 12/5/2004. Used in the Japanese version of the Boktai 2 commercial.
2. Kidoairaku (喜怒哀楽)
3. Sotsugyou no Uta (卒業のうた)
4. Rashikuare! (らしくあれ)
5. Orange Spectrum (オレンジ･スペクトラム)
6. Sekai ga Hare tahi ni wa (世界が晴れた日には)

Album
 We Are Hungry Days! (俺たちがHungry Days!!) - 9/2/2005
 Zero kara no Shoudou (0からの衝動) - 22/2/2006
 Best Days - 28/6/2006

References
 Hungry Days, (2005) 俺たちがHungry Days!! - We Are Hungry Days!!, Japan.

External links
 Hungry Days official website

Japanese rock music groups